Sablino is the name of several rural localities in Russia:
Sablino, Moscow Oblast, a village in Zaraysky District of Moscow Oblast
Sablino, Orenburg Oblast, a selo in Grachyovsky District of Orenburg Oblast